Grendon, meaning Green Hill (Don) or Green Valley (Dene) in Old English, may refer to:

Places
Grendon, Northamptonshire, a small village in Northamptonshire, England
Grendon, Atherstone, a civil parish in Warwickshire, England
Grendon Underwood, a village and civil parish in Buckinghamshire, England
HM Prison Grendon, a prison in Buckinghamshire, England
New Grendon, a village in Warwickshire, England
Old Grendon, a village in Warwickshire, England

People
Stephen Grendon, a pen name of August Derleth

Fictional
Dr. E. Grendon, the final character in Michael Cox's The Meaning of Night

Companies
Thomas Grendon and Company, an Ironworks Foundry and Locomotive builder of Drogheda, Ireland

Titles
Viscount Hatton, of Grendon